Acer laurinum is an evergreen Asian tree in the family Sapindaceae. It is the only member of its genus with native populations in the Southern Hemisphere, with a distribution encompassing Burma (Myanmar), Cambodia, India, Indonesia, Laos (Khammouan), Malaysia, Nepal, Philippines, Thailand, and southwestern China (Guangxi, Hainan, Tibet, Yunnan).

Acer laurinum reaches  in height. It has a trunk with scaly, red-brown bark. The leaves are glabrous, with no lobes or teeth. It has white flowers, followed by paired samaras. The species is dioecious, with separate male and female flowers.

References

External links
Dave's Garden, Indonesian Maple, Acer laurinum photos
line drawing for Flora of China

laurinum
Flora of China
Flora of tropical Asia
Plants described in 1843
Dioecious plants